Krynice  is a village in Tomaszów Lubelski County, Lublin Voivodeship, in eastern Poland. It is the seat of the gmina (administrative district) called Gmina Krynice.

References

Krynice